Apostol Trpeski (6 September 1948) is a Macedonian cinematographer.

Biography
Trpeski was born on September 6, 1948, in Tetovo, SFR Yugoslavia (today North Macedonia). He graduated from the Academy for theater, film and television art – Cinematography Department at the University of Zagreb, Croatia.

Career background
From 1971 until 1992, he worked at the Macedonian National Television as a cinematographer and director of photography. He shot many series and TV shows of different genres, made about a hundred reportages, many documentary films and TV movies and about a hundred more music shows, series and music and commercial videos, using all kinds of technologies.

Since 1992, he has been working as a professor and Head of the Film and TV Camera Department at Ss. Cyril and Methodius University Faculty of Dramatic Arts in Skopje. He was vice-dean of the Faculty of Dramatic Arts for ten years.

He is a member of the Macedonian Film Professionals Association and a member of the Council of the International Cinematographers Film Festival "Manaki brothers". He was a member of the Senate of the Ss. Cyril and Methodius University and of the Broadcasting Council of the Republic of Macedonia. He was chairman of the board of the Macedonian Film Fund.

He is the author of the book Film and TV camera, book 1 - basis of the cinematography techniques (2000).

He has been awarded many prizes for his work.

Films

As focus puller
 1984: Did I not tell you (Нели ти реков)

As director of photography
 1993: Wonderful World, segment of the first Macedonian omnibus "Light Grey" (Светло сиво)
 1997: Gypsy Magic
 2002: Heart of the Stone (Каменот тежи на своето место)
 2002: Slander (Клевета)
 2003: A Step ahead the time (Чекор пред времето)
 2003: When the master of language (Кај мајсторот јазичар)
 2004: Under
 2006: Navi
 2007: Temptation (Искушение) 
 2009: Delirium (Бунило)
 2014: To the Hilt (До балчак)
 2016: Golden Five (Златна петорка)
 2016: Love and Betrayal (Љубов и предавство) (TV series)
 2018: The Red Poet (Црвениот поет) (10 episodes)

As cinematographer
 2001: Holly Liturgy of St. John Chrysostom (Божествена Литургија на Св. Јован Златоуст) (documentary film)

External links 
 Cinematheque of Macedonia
 
 Faculty of Dramatic Arts - Skopje
 Animex Skopje Animation Festival
 UNIVERSITY OF ZAGREB, ACADEMY OF DRAMATIC ARTS

References

1948 births
Living people
People from Tetovo
Macedonian film directors
Macedonian artists
Academic staff of the Ss. Cyril and Methodius University of Skopje
Academy of Dramatic Art, University of Zagreb alumni